Gianfranco Terenzi (2 January 1941 – 20 May 2020) was a Sammarinese politician who served as captain regent on four occasions. He was a member of the Sammarinese Christian Democratic Party.

His first term was with Rossano Zafferani (October 1987-April 1988). His second term was with Enzo Colombini from (October 2000-April 2001). His third term was with Loris Francini from April 2006 to October 2006. His fourth term was with Guerrino Zanotti (October 2014-April 2015).

Terenzi died on 20 May 2020 after being hit by a truck, aged 79.

References

1941 births
2020 deaths
People from the City of San Marino
Captains Regent of San Marino
Members of the Grand and General Council
Sammarinese Christian Democratic Party politicians
Road incident deaths in San Marino